The Buffalo Bisons were a minor league baseball team based in Buffalo, New York, that played in the International Association for Professional Base Ball Players in 1878, 1887 and 1888. The 1887 and 1888 team featured Baseball Hall of Famer Frank Grant.

National Baseball Hall of Fame members

References

Baseball teams established in 1878
Defunct minor league baseball teams
Professional baseball teams in New York (state)
Sports in Buffalo, New York
Defunct baseball teams in New York (state)
League Alliance teams
Baseball teams disestablished in 1888